The word  is a Japanese-language term for various mythical techniques of rapid movement. The characters in the word can be rendered literally as "shrinking the earth," referring to how the technique reduces the spatial distance between two points to achieve its effect.

History
The word first appears in Shenxian Zhuan to describe the ability of Taoist magician Fei Changfang.

The term  suōdìmài denotes the power of teleportation attributed to some xians. Those possessing this ability were believed to be capable of moving vast distances in a single step. The term is sometimes used to refer to a similar ability in Buddhist belief.

Appearances

In martial arts 
In modern Japanese martial arts, shukuchi refers to a sudden movement into an enemy's maai (space) or blind spot to attack. This definition is relatively recent, and is, therefore, used somewhat differently by various schools.

In Korea 
The ability of chukjibeop (축지법 縮地法) was attributed to North Korean leaders Kim Il-sung and Kim Jong-il in the propaganda song "The General Uses Warp". According to a quote in an DPRK official newspaper, the attribution is purely a metaphor for People's War.

In popular culture
Fictionalized versions of shukuchi are common in manga, anime and video games. In this context, it is usually portrayed as short-range teleportation or as the ability to move quickly enough to become invisible.

Manga and anime
Son Goku, the main character of the Dragon Ball franchise, is seen performing this feat as a child and eventually masters the art of teleporting when an adult.
Seta Sōjirō from Rurouni Kenshin can use shukuji.
Various characters in Negima!: Magister Negi Magi employ such techniques.
In the manga and anime Prince of Tennis the shukuchi method is used by players of the Higa Middle School from Okinawa to give the illusion of moving from the baseline of a tennis court to the net in a split second.

Video games
Weaver, a character from the popular video game Dota 2, has an ability called Shukuchi, which allows it to become invisible and run with very high movement speed for a short period of time.
In the Square Enix MMORPG Final Fantasy XIV, the Ninja job has an ability called Shukuchi which allows the user to move extremely quickly to a targeted location, almost teleporting. 
In the Touhou Project series, the sennin Toyosatomimi no Miko has a technique called Shukuchi Cape, which allows her to teleport.
In the video game Danganronpa V3: Killing Harmony, the character Ryoma Hoshi mentions this technique as a way to escape others quickly.
In the video game Fate/Grand Order, Shukuchi is one of Okita Souji's skills and a part of Ushiwakamaru's "Usumidori - Heavenly Blade Steps".

References

Japanese words and phrases